Live & Backstage at Blare Fest. 2020 is the fourth live album by Japanese band Coldrain. Recorded at Port Messe in Nagoya, Japan on February 1 & 2, 2020, it was produced by Jiei Mogi and was released on October 28, 2020.

Background
On 4 November, 2019, it was announced that the annually held concert "Blaredown Barriers" hosted by the band would be converted into a festival for the first time in its history. Renaming the event to be called "Blare Fest" in the process, as well as announcing the first set of bands to play the festival such as Crossfaith, Crystal Lake, SiM, The Word Alive and Fever 333.

As the weeks would go on, they would announce other bands such as One OK Rock, Man with a Mission, Volumes, Crown the Empire and We Came as Romans.

Barely a month after Blare Fest concluded, the arising COVID-19 pandemic forced the majority of countries to lockdown, including Japan. This would halt any plans the band had for the rest of the year, who were forced into postponing or cancelling all concerts. This would end up including their one man live show at the world renowned Yokohama Arena, which along with the cancellation announcement on 4 September, 2020, they announced the DVD/Blu-ray live album for Live & Backstage at Blare Fest. 2020.

Track listing
Live & Backstage at Blare Fest. 2020 was released in DVD and Blu-ray formats.

Day 1

Day 2

Personnel

Coldrain
  – lead vocals, production
  – lead guitar, programming, keyboards
  – rhythm guitar, guitar, backing vocals
  – bass guitar, backing vocals
  – drums, percussion

Charts

References

External links 
 

Coldrain albums
2020 live albums
2020 video albums
Live video albums
Warner Music Group live albums
Warner Music Group video albums